Christopher Beck Bennett (born October 1, 1984) is an American actor, comedian, writer, and singer. Bennett was a cast member on the NBC sketch comedy series Saturday Night Live for eight seasons, joining the show for its 39th season in 2013, and leaving at the end of its 46th season in 2021. Prior to SNL, he performed in AT&T's "It's Not Complicated" commercials, in which he interviewed children, and produced sketch videos with the comedy group Good Neighbor. He also hosted the YouTube show Theatre of Life.

Early life
Bennett was born in Wilmette, Illinois (a suburb of Chicago), the son of Sarah and Andy Bennett. He performed in multiple shows at Children's Theatre of Winnetka. He graduated from New Trier High School in 2003 where he played Jean Valjean in his school's production of Les Misérables. Bennett attended the USC School of Dramatic Arts in the B.F.A. Acting program.

Career
In 2003, Bennett joined the improv/sketch group Commedus Interruptus along with fellow future SNL cast member  Kyle Mooney and Nick Rutherford. In 2007, after graduation, Mooney, Rutherford, and Bennett joined with editor/director Dave McCary to form the sketch group Good Neighbor. The group received praise from comedian Louis C.K. and director Steven Spielberg, who sent Mooney, Bennett, Rutherford, and McCary a personal acknowledgement after being impressed with the Hook parody, Unbelievable Dinner. He complimented the sketch and encouraged the group to continue making funny movies.

In 2011, Bennett created the satirical political talk show Fresh Perspectives, which helped him land his AT&T commercials interviewing children.

In 2012, he appeared in the film Kill Me Now, a film starring multiple Internet sketch-comedy groups, and filmed Beside Still Waters by writer/director Chris Lowell.

In March 2013, he appeared in an episode of Last Man Standing, and that August voiced a character for Axe Cop for Fox's Animation Domination High-Def programming block. That year, Good Neighbor produced a pilot for Comedy Central with Adam McKay's Gary Sanchez production company, though it was not picked up as a series, due to the move of three of the troupe's four members to New York City to star on Saturday Night Live. That same year, Bennett completed work on the independent film Balls Out and appeared in season 4 of Arrested Development.

Bennett voiced Launchpad McQuack in the DuckTales reboot which ran from 2017 to 2021, and Eric the robot in the Sony Pictures Animation film The Mitchells vs. the Machines. He is currently the voice of Hamster in another Disney animated series, Hamster & Gretel.

Saturday Night Live
Bennett debuted as a featured player on Saturday Night Live in its 39th season on September 28, 2013. He was promoted to repertory status for Saturday Night Live's 41st season on October 2, 2015. He left the show following the finale of the 46th season on May 22, 2021. In an interview with Time magazine, Bennett stated he chose to leave the show so he could be with his wife in Los Angeles instead of remaining in New York City and maintaining a long-distance relationship.

Personal life
On May 13, 2016, Bennett posted a photograph of himself with his girlfriend Jessy Hodges, with a caption that stated that the couple were celebrating five years together. The couple married on August 25, 2018. Bennett has been friends with fellow SNL cast member Kyle Mooney since they were students at the University of Southern California.

Filmography

Film

Television

References

External links
 

1984 births
Living people
American male comedians
American male television actors
American male voice actors
USC School of Dramatic Arts alumni
People from Wilmette, Illinois
New Trier High School alumni
American male film actors
Male actors from Illinois
21st-century American male actors
American impressionists (entertainers)
American sketch comedians
Comedians from Illinois
21st-century American comedians